Peak oil is the hypothetical point in time when the maximum rate of global oil production is reached, after which it is argued that production will begin an irreversible decline. It is related to the distinct concept of oil depletion; while global petroleum reserves are finite, the limiting factor is not whether the oil exists but whether it can be extracted economically at a given price. A secular decline in oil extraction could be caused both by depletion of accessible reserves and by reductions in demand that reduce the price relative to the cost of extraction, as might be induced to reduce carbon emissions.

Numerous predictions of the timing of peak oil have been made over the past century before being falsified by subsequent growth in the rate of petroleum extraction. M. King Hubbert is often credited with introducing the notion in a 1956 paper which presented a formal theory and predicted U.S. extraction to peak between 1965 and 1971. Hubbert's original predictions for world peak oil production proved premature and, forecasts of the year of peak oil range from 2019 to 2040. These predictions are dependent on future economic trends, technological developments, and efforts by societies and governments to moderate climate change.

Predictions of future oil production made in 2007 and 2009 stated either that the peak had already occurred, that oil production was on the cusp of the peak, or that it would occur soon. A decade later world oil production rose to hit a new high in 2018, as developments in extraction technology enabled an expansion of U.S. tight oil production. Following a collapse in oil demand at the outset of the COVID-19 pandemic and a price war between Saudi Arabia and Russia, a number of organizations have put forward predictions of a peak in the next 10 to 15 years.

Modeling global oil production

The idea that the rate of oil production would peak and irreversibly decline is an old one. In 1919, David White, chief geologist of the United States Geological Survey, wrote of US petroleum: "... the peak of production will soon be passed, possibly within 3 years." In 1953, Eugene Ayers, a researcher for Gulf Oil, projected that if US ultimate recoverable oil reserves were 100 billion barrels, then production in the US would peak no later than 1960. If ultimate recoverable were to be as high as 200 billion barrels, which he warned was wishful thinking, US peak production would come no later than 1970. Likewise for the world, he projected a peak somewhere between 1985 (one trillion barrels ultimate recoverable) and 2000 (two trillion barrels recoverable). Ayers made his projections without a mathematical model. He wrote: "But if the curve is made to look reasonable, it is quite possible to adapt mathematical expressions to it and to determine, in this way, the peak dates corresponding to various ultimate recoverable reserve numbers"

By observing past discoveries and production levels, and predicting future discovery trends, the geoscientist M. King Hubbert used statistical modelling in 1956 to predict that United States oil production would peak between 1965 and 1971. This prediction appeared accurate for a time however during 2018 daily production of oil in the United States was exceeding daily production in 1970, the year that was previously the peak. Hubbert used a semi-logistical curved model (sometimes incorrectly compared to a normal distribution). He assumed the production rate of a limited resource would follow a roughly symmetrical distribution. Depending on the limits of exploitability and market pressures, the rise or decline of resource production over time might be sharper or more stable, appear more linear or curved. That model and its variants are now called Hubbert peak theory; they have been used to describe and predict the peak and decline of production from regions, countries, and multinational areas. The same theory has also been applied to other limited-resource production.

More recently, the term "peak oil" was popularized by Colin Campbell and Kjell Aleklett in 2002 when they helped form the Association for the Study of Peak Oil and Gas (ASPO). In his publications, Hubbert used the term "peak production rate" and "peak in the rate of discoveries".

In a 2006 analysis of Hubbert theory, it was noted that uncertainty in real world oil production amounts and confusion in definitions increases the uncertainty in general of production predictions. By comparing the fit of various other models, it was found that Hubbert's methods yielded the closest fit overall but none of the models were very accurate. In 1956 Hubbert himself recommended using "a family of possible production curves" when predicting a production peak and decline curve.

A comprehensive 2009 study of oil depletion by the UK Energy Research Centre noted:

The report noted that Hubbert had used the logistic curve because it was mathematically convenient, not because he believed it to be literally correct. The study observed that in most cases the asymmetric exponential model provided a better fit (as in the case of Seneca cliff model), and that peaks tended to occur well before half the oil had been produced, with the result that in nearly all cases, the post-peak decline was more gradual than the increase leading up to the peak.

Demand

The demand side of peak oil over time is concerned with the total quantity of oil that the global market would choose to consume at any given market price. The hypothesis that peak oil would be driven by a reduction in the availability of easily extractable oil implies that prices will increase over time to match demand with a declining supply. By contrast, developments since 2010 have given rise to the idea of demand-driven peak oil. The central idea is that, in response to technological developments and pressure to reduce carbon dioxide emissions, demand for oil at any given price will decline. In this context, the development of electric vehicles creates the possibility that the primary use of oil, transportation, will diminish in importance over time.

After growing steadily until around 2006, oil demand has fluctuated, falling during recession periods, and then recovering, but at slower growth rates than in the past. Oil demand fell sharply during the early stages of the COVID-19 pandemic, with global demand for oil dropping from 100 million barrels a day in 2019 to 90 million in 2020. The drop in demand is not expected to recover until at least 2022, and British Petroleum predicts that oil demand will never recover to pre-pandemic levels due to increased proliferation of electric vehicles and stronger action on climate change. Developments in 2021 at Exxon, Chevron and Shell also lent further credence to the idea that peak oil had happened in 2019.

Energy demand is distributed amongst four broad sectors: transportation, residential, commercial, and industrial. In terms of oil use, transportation is the largest sector and the one that has seen the largest growth in demand in recent decades. This growth has largely come from new demand for personal-use vehicles powered by internal combustion engines. This sector also has the highest consumption rates, accounting for approximately 71% of the oil used in the United States in 2013. and 55% of oil use worldwide as documented in the Hirsch report. Transportation is therefore of particular interest to those seeking to mitigate the effects of peak oil.

Although demand growth is highest in the developing world, the United States is the world's largest consumer of petroleum. The Energy Information Administration (EIA) stated that gasoline usage in the United States may have peaked in 2007, in part because of increasing interest in and mandates for use of biofuels and energy efficiency.

As countries develop, industry and higher living standards drive up energy use, oil usage being a major component. Thriving economies, such as China and India, are quickly becoming large oil consumers. For example, China surpassed the United States as the world's largest crude oil importer in 2015. Oil consumption growth is expected to continue; however, not at previous rates, as China's economic growth is predicted to decrease from the high rates of the early part of the 21st century.

Population
Another significant factor affecting petroleum demand has been human population growth. The United States Census Bureau predicts that world population in 2030 will be almost double that of 1980. Oil production per capita peaked in 1979 at 5.5 barrels/year but then declined to fluctuate around 4.5 barrels/year since. In this regard, the decreasing population growth rate since the 1970s has somewhat ameliorated the per capita decline.

Economic growth
Some analysts argue that the cost of oil has a profound effect on economic growth due to its pivotal role in the extraction of resources and the processing, manufacturing, and transportation of goods. As the industrial effort to extract new unconventional oil sources increases, this has a compounding negative effect on all sectors of the economy, leading to economic stagnation or even eventual contraction. Such a scenario would result in an inability for national economies to pay high oil prices, leading to declining demand and a price collapse.

Supply

Defining sources of oil
Oil may come from conventional or unconventional sources. The terms are not strictly defined, and vary within the literature as definitions based on new technologies tend to change over time. As a result, different oil forecasting studies have included different classes of liquid fuels. Some use the terms "conventional" oil for what is included in the model, and "unconventional" oil for classes excluded.

In 1956, Hubbert confined his peak oil prediction to that crude oil "producible by methods now in use." By 1962, however, his analyses included future improvements in exploration and production. All of Hubbert's analyses of peak oil specifically excluded oil manufactured from oil shale or mined from oil sands. A 2013 study predicting an early peak excluded deepwater oil, tight oil, oil with API gravity less than 17.5, and oil close to the poles, such as that on the North Slope of Alaska, all of which it defined as non-conventional. Some commonly used definitions for conventional and unconventional oil are detailed below.

Conventional sources
Conventional oil is extracted on land and offshore using "standard" (i.e., in common use before 2000) techniques, and can be categorized as light, medium, heavy, or extra heavy in grade. The exact definitions of these grades vary depending on the region from which the oil came.
Light oil flows naturally to the surface or can be extracted by simply pumping it out of the ground. Heavy refers to oil that has higher density and therefore lower API gravity. It does not flow easily, and its consistency is similar to that of molasses. While some of it can be produced using conventional techniques, recovery rates are better using unconventional methods.

According to the International Energy Agency, production of conventional crude oil (as then defined) peaked in 2006, with an all-time maximum of 70 million barrels per day.

 Tight oil was typically classified as "unconventional" prior to about 2006, but more recent analyses began to consider it to be "conventional" as its extraction became more common. It is extracted from deposits of low-permeability rock, sometimes shale deposits but often other rock types, using hydraulic fracturing, or "fracking." It is often confused with shale oil, which is oil manufactured from the kerogen contained in an oil shale (see below), Production of tight oil has led to a resurgence of US production in recent years. U.S. tight oil production peaked in March 2015, and fell a total of 12 percent over the next 18 months. But then U.S. tight oil production rose again, and by September 2017 had exceeded the old peak, and as of October 2017, U.S. tight oil production was still rising. Tight oil as a whole peaked in late 2019, although it is unclear whether this was due to the COVID-19 pandemic; however, the Eagle Ford formation appeared to have peaked in 2015 and the Bakken has reached well saturation in top-producing regions.

Unconventional sources

As of 2019, oil considered unconventional is derived from multiple sources.

 Oil shale is a common term for sedimentary rock such as shale or marl, containing kerogen, a waxy oil precursor that has not yet been transformed into crude oil by the high pressures and temperatures caused by deep burial. The term "oil shale" is somewhat confusing, because what is referred to in the U.S. as "oil shale" is not really oil and the rock it is found in is generally not shale. Since it is close to the surface rather than buried deep in the earth, the shale or marl is typically mined, crushed, and retorted, producing synthetic oil from the kerogen. Its net energy yield is much lower than conventional oil, so much so that estimates of the net energy yield of shale discoveries are considered extremely unreliable.
 Oil sands are unconsolidated sandstone deposits containing large amounts of very viscous crude bitumen or extra-heavy crude oil that can be recovered by surface mining or by in-situ oil wells using steam injection or other techniques. It can be liquefied by upgrading, blending with diluent, or by heating; and then processed by a conventional oil refinery. The recovery process requires advanced technology but is more efficient than that of oil shale. The reason is that, unlike U.S. "oil shale", Canadian oil sands actually contain oil, and the sandstones they are found in are much easier to produce oil from than shale or marl. In the U.S. dialect of English, these formations are often called "tar sands", but the material found in them is not tar but an extra-heavy and viscous form of oil technically known as bitumen. Venezuela has oil sands deposits similar in size to those of Canada, and approximately equal to the world's reserves of conventional oil. Venezuela's Orinoco Belt tar sands are less viscous than Canada's Athabasca oil sands – meaning they can be produced by more conventional means – but they are buried too deep to be extracted by surface mining.

 Coal liquefaction or gas to liquids product are liquid hydrocarbons that are synthesised from the conversion of coal or natural gas by the Fischer–Tropsch process, Bergius process, or Karrick process. Currently, two companies SASOL and Shell, have synthetic oil technology proven to work on a commercial scale. Sasol's primary business is based on CTL (coal-to-liquid) and GTL (natural gas-to-liquid) technology, producing US$4.40 billion in revenues (FY2009). Shell has used these processes to recycle waste flare gas (usually burnt off at oil wells and refineries) into usable synthetic oil. However, for CTL there may be insufficient coal reserves to supply global needs for both liquid fuels and electric power generation.
 Minor sources include thermal depolymerization, as discussed in a 2003 article in Discover magazine, that could be used to manufacture oil indefinitely, out of garbage, sewage, and agricultural waste. The article claimed that the cost of the process was $15 per barrel. A follow-up article in 2006 stated that the cost was actually $80 per barrel, because the feedstock that had previously been considered as hazardous waste now had market value. A 2008 news bulletin published by Los Alamos Laboratory proposed that hydrogen (possibly produced using hot fluid from nuclear reactors to split water into hydrogen and oxygen) in combination with sequestered  could be used to produce methanol (CH3OH), which could then be converted into gasoline.

Discoveries

The peak of world oilfield discoveries occurred in the 1960s at around (Gb)/year. According to the Association for the Study of Peak Oil and Gas (ASPO), the rate of discovery has been falling steadily since. Less than 10 Gb/yr of oil were discovered each year between 2002 and 2007. According to a 2010 Reuters article, the annual rate of discovery of new fields has remained remarkably constant at 15–20 Gb/yr.

But despite the fall-off in new field discoveries, and record-high production rates, the reported proved reserves of crude oil remaining in the ground in 2014, which totaled 1,490 billion barrels, not counting Canadian heavy oil sands, were more than quadruple the 1965 proved reserves of 354 billion barrels. A researcher for the U.S. Energy Information Administration has pointed out that after the first wave of discoveries in an area, most oil and natural gas reserve growth comes not from discoveries of new fields, but from extensions and additional gas found within existing fields.

A report by the UK Energy Research Centre noted that "discovery" is often used ambiguously, and explained the seeming contradiction between falling discovery rates since the 1960s and increasing reserves by the phenomenon of reserve growth. The report noted that increased reserves within a field may be discovered or developed by new technology years or decades after the original discovery. But because of the practice of "backdating", any new reserves within a field, even those to be discovered decades after the field discovery, are attributed to the year of initial field discovery, creating an illusion that discovery is not keeping pace with production.

Reserves

Total possible conventional crude oil reserves include crude oil with 90% certainty of being technically able to be produced from reservoirs (through a wellbore using primary, secondary, improved, enhanced, or tertiary methods); all crude with a 50% probability of being produced in the future (probable); and discovered reserves that have a 10% possibility of being produced in the future (possible). Reserve estimates based on these are referred to as 1P, proven (at least 90% probability); 2P, proven and probable (at least 50% probability); and 3P, proven, probable and possible (at least 10% probability), respectively. This does not include liquids extracted from mined solids or gasses (oil sands, oil shale, gas-to-liquid processes, or coal-to-liquid processes).

Hubbert's 1956 peak projection for the United States depended on geological estimates of ultimate recoverable oil resources, but starting in his 1962 publication, he concluded that ultimate oil recovery was an output of his mathematical analysis, rather than an assumption. He regarded his peak oil calculation as independent of reserve estimates.

Many current 2P calculations predict reserves to be between 1150 and 1350 Gb, but some authors have written that because of misinformation, withheld information, and misleading reserve calculations, 2P reserves are likely nearer to 850–900 Gb. The Energy Watch Group wrote that actual reserves peaked in 1980, when production first surpassed new discoveries, that apparent increases in reserves since then are illusory, and concluded (in 2007): "Probably the world oil production has peaked already, but we cannot be sure yet."

Concerns over stated reserves

Sadad Al Husseini estimated that  of the world's  of proven reserves should be recategorized as speculative resources.

One difficulty in forecasting the date of peak oil is the opacity surrounding the oil reserves classified as "proven". In many major producing countries, the majority of reserves claims have not been subject to outside audit or examination. Several worrying signs concerning the depletion of proven reserves emerged in about 2004. This was best exemplified by the 2004 scandal surrounding the "evaporation" of 20% of Shell's reserves.

For the most part, proven reserves are stated by the oil companies, the producer states and the consumer states. All three have reasons to overstate their proven reserves: oil companies may look to increase their potential worth; producer countries gain a stronger international stature; and governments of consumer countries may seek a means to foster sentiments of security and stability within their economies and among consumers.

Major discrepancies arise from accuracy issues with the self-reported numbers from the Organization of the Petroleum Exporting Countries (OPEC). Besides the possibility that these nations have overstated their reserves for political reasons (during periods of no substantial discoveries), over 70 nations also follow a practice of not reducing their reserves to account for yearly production. Analysts have suggested that OPEC member nations have economic incentives to exaggerate their reserves, as the OPEC quota system allows greater output for countries with greater reserves.

Kuwait, for example, was reported in the January 2006 issue of Petroleum Intelligence Weekly to have only  in reserve, of which only 24 were fully proven. This report was based on the leak of a confidential document from Kuwait and has not been formally denied by the Kuwaiti authorities. This leaked document is from 2001, but excludes revisions or discoveries made since then. Additionally, the reported  of oil burned off by Iraqi soldiers in the First Persian Gulf War are conspicuously missing from Kuwait's figures.

On the other hand, investigative journalist Greg Palast argues that oil companies have an interest in making oil look more rare than it is, to justify higher prices. This view is contested by ecological journalist Richard Heinberg. Other analysts argue that oil producing countries understate the extent of their reserves to drive up the price.

The EUR reported by the 2000 USGS survey of  has been criticized for assuming a discovery trend over the next twenty years that would reverse the observed trend of the past 40 years. Their 95% confidence EUR of  assumed that discovery levels would stay steady, despite the fact that new-field discovery rates have declined since the 1960s. That trend of falling discoveries has continued in the ten years since the USGS made their assumption. The 2000 USGS is also criticized for other assumptions, as well as assuming 2030 production rates inconsistent with projected reserves.

Reserves of unconventional oil

As conventional oil becomes less available, it can be replaced with production of liquids from unconventional sources such as tight oil, oil sands, ultra-heavy oils, gas-to-liquid technologies, coal-to-liquid technologies, biofuel technologies, and shale oil. In the 2007 and subsequent International Energy Outlook editions, the word "Oil" was replaced with "Liquids" in the chart of world energy consumption. In 2009 biofuels was included in "Liquids" instead of in "Renewables". The inclusion of natural gas liquids, a bi-product of natural gas extraction, in "Liquids" has been criticized as it is mostly a chemical feedstock which is generally not used as transport fuel.

Reserve estimates are based on profitability, which depends on both oil price and cost of production. Hence, unconventional sources such as heavy crude oil, oil sands, and oil shale may be included as new techniques reduce the cost of extraction. With rule changes by the SEC, oil companies can now book them as proven reserves after opening a strip mine or thermal facility for extraction. These unconventional sources are more labor and resource intensive to produce, however, requiring extra energy to refine, resulting in higher production costs and up to three times more greenhouse gas emissions per barrel (or barrel equivalent) on a "well to tank" basis or 10 to 45% more on a "well to wheels" basis, which includes the carbon emitted from combustion of the final product.

While the energy used, resources needed, and environmental effects of extracting unconventional sources have traditionally been prohibitively high, major unconventional oil sources being considered for large-scale production are the extra heavy oil in the Orinoco Belt of Venezuela, the Athabasca Oil Sands in the Western Canadian Sedimentary Basin, and the oil shale of the Green River Formation in Colorado, Utah, and Wyoming in the United States. Energy companies such as Syncrude and Suncor have been extracting bitumen for decades but production has increased greatly in recent years with the development of steam-assisted gravity drainage and other extraction technologies.

Chuck Masters of the USGS estimates that, "Taken together, these resource occurrences, in the Western Hemisphere, are approximately equal to the Identified Reserves of conventional crude oil accredited to the Middle East." Authorities familiar with the resources believe that the world's ultimate reserves of unconventional oil are several times as large as those of conventional oil and will be highly profitable for companies as a result of higher prices in the 21st century.

Despite the large quantities of oil available in non-conventional sources, Matthew Simmons argued in 2005 that limitations on production prevent them from becoming an effective substitute for conventional crude oil. Simmons stated "these are high energy intensity projects that can never reach high volumes" to offset significant losses from other sources. Another study claims that even under highly optimistic assumptions, "Canada's oil sands will not prevent peak oil", although production could reach  by 2030 in a "crash program" development effort.

Moreover, oil extracted from these sources typically contains contaminants such as sulfur and heavy metals that are energy-intensive to extract and can leave tailings, ponds containing hydrocarbon sludge, in some cases. The same applies to much of the Middle East's undeveloped conventional oil reserves, much of which is heavy, viscous, and contaminated with sulfur and metals to the point of being unusable. However, high oil prices make these sources more financially appealing. A study by Wood Mackenzie suggests that by the early 2020s all the world's extra oil supply is likely to come from unconventional sources.

Production

The point in time when peak global oil production occurs defines peak oil. Some believe that the increasing industrial effort to extract oil will have a negative effect on global economic growth, leading to demand contraction and a price collapse, thereby causing production decline as some unconventional sources become uneconomical. Some believe that the peak may be to some extent led by declining demand as new technologies and improving efficiency shift energy usage away from oil.

Worldwide oil discoveries have been less than annual production since 1980. World population has grown faster than oil production. Because of this, oil production per capita peaked in 1979 (preceded by a plateau during the period of 1973–1979).

The increasing investment in harder-to-reach oil as of 2005 was said to signal oil companies' belief in the end of easy oil. While it is widely believed that increased oil prices spur an increase in production, an increased number of oil industry insiders believed in 2008 that even with higher prices, oil production was unlikely to increase significantly. Among the reasons cited were both geological factors as well as "above ground" factors that are likely to see oil production plateau.

A 2008 Journal of Energy Security analysis of the energy return on drilling effort (energy returned on energy invested, also referred to as EROEI) in the United States concluded that there was extremely limited potential to increase production of both gas and (especially) oil. By looking at the historical response of production to variation in drilling effort, the analysis showed very little increase of production attributable to increased drilling. This was because of diminishing returns with increasing drilling effort: as drilling effort increased, the energy obtained per active drill rig in the past had been reduced according to a severely diminishing power law. The study concluded that even an enormous increase of drilling effort was unlikely to significantly increase oil and gas production in a mature petroleum region such as the United States. However, contrary to the study's conclusion, since the analysis was published in 2008, US production of crude oil has more than doubled, increasing 119%, and production of dry natural gas has increased 51% (2018 compared to 2008).

The previous assumption of inevitable declining volumes of oil and gas produced per unit of effort is contrary to recent experience in the US. In the United States, as of 2017, there has been an ongoing decade-long increase in the productivity of oil and gas drilling in all the major tight oil and gas plays. The US Energy Information Administration reports, for instance, that in the Bakken Shale production area of North Dakota, the volume of oil produced per day of drilling rig time in January 2017 was 4 times the oil volume per day of drilling five years previous, in January 2012, and nearly 10 times the oil volume per day of ten years previous, in January 2007. In the Marcellus gas region of the northeast, The volume of gas produced per day of drilling time in January 2017 was 3 times the gas volume per day of drilling five years previous, in January 2012, and 28 times the gas volume per day of drilling ten years previous, in January 2007.

New research estimates that the energy required to produce all petroleum liquids (not including transportation, refining and distribution) represents today the equivalent of 16% of this same production and by 2050, an amount equivalent to half of the gross energy production will be required. For gases, the energy needed for production is estimated to be equivalent to 7% of the gross energy produced today, and 24% for 2050.

Anticipated production by major agencies

Average yearly gains in global supply from 1987 to 2005 were  (1.7%). More recently, the EIA's Annual Energy Outlook 2015 indicated no production peak out to 2040. However, this required a future Brent crude oil price of $US144/bbl (2013 dollars) "as growing demand leads to the development of more costly resources".

Oil field decline

In a 2013 study of 733 giant oil fields, only 32% of the ultimately recoverable oil, condensate and gas remained. Ghawar, which is the largest oil field in the world and responsible for approximately half of Saudi Arabia's oil production over the last 50 years, was in decline before 2009. The world's second largest oil field, the Burgan Field in Kuwait, entered decline in November 2005.

Mexico announced that production from its giant Cantarell Field began to decline in March 2006, reportedly at a rate of 13% per year. Also in 2006, Saudi Aramco Senior Vice President Abdullah Saif estimated that its existing fields were declining at a rate of 5% to 12% per year. According to a study of the largest 811 oilfields conducted in early 2008 by Cambridge Energy Research Associates, the average rate of field decline is 4.5% per year. The Association for the Study of Peak Oil and Gas agreed with their decline rates, but considered the rate of new fields coming online overly optimistic. The IEA stated in November 2008 that an analysis of 800 oilfields showed the decline in oil production to be 6.7% a year for fields past their peak, and that this would grow to 8.6% in 2030. A more rapid annual rate of decline of 5.1% in 800 of the world's largest oil fields weighted for production over their whole lives was reported by the International Energy Agency in their World Energy Outlook 2008. The 2013 study of 733 giant fields mentioned previously had an average decline rate 3.83% which was described as "conservative." The United States' oil production peaked in February 2020, at about 18,826,000 barrels per day.

Control over supply
Entities such as governments or cartels can reduce supply to the world market by limiting access to the supply through nationalizing oil, cutting back on production, limiting drilling rights, imposing taxes, etc. International sanctions, corruption, and military conflicts can also reduce supply.

Nationalization of oil supplies

Another factor affecting global oil supply is the nationalization of oil reserves by producing nations. The nationalization of oil occurs as countries begin to deprivatize oil production and withhold exports. Kate Dourian, Platts' Middle East editor, points out that while estimates of oil reserves may vary, politics have now entered the equation of oil supply. "Some countries are becoming off limits. Major oil companies operating in Venezuela find themselves in a difficult position because of the growing nationalization of that resource. These countries are now reluctant to share their reserves."

According to consulting firm PFC Energy, only 7% of the world's estimated oil and gas reserves are in countries that allow companies like ExxonMobil free rein. Fully 65% are in the hands of state-owned companies such as Saudi Aramco, with the rest in countries such as Russia and Venezuela, where access by Western European and North American companies is difficult. The PFC study implies political factors are limiting capacity increases in Mexico, Venezuela, Iran, Iraq, Kuwait, and Russia. Saudi Arabia is also limiting capacity expansion, but because of a self-imposed cap, unlike the other countries. As a result of not having access to countries amenable to oil exploration, ExxonMobil is not making nearly the investment in finding new oil that it did in 1981.

OPEC influence on supply

OPEC is an alliance among 14 diverse oil-producing countries (as of January 2019: Algeria, Angola, Ecuador, Equatorial Guinea, Gabon, Iran, Iraq, Kuwait, Libya, Nigeria, Republic of the Congo, Saudi Arabia, United Arab Emirates, Venezuela) to manage the supply of oil. OPEC's power was consolidated in the 1960s and 1970s as various countries nationalized their oil holdings, and wrested decision-making away from the "Seven Sisters" (Anglo-Iranian, Socony, Royal Dutch Shell, Gulf, Esso, Texaco, Socal), and created their own oil companies to control the oil. OPEC often tries to influence prices by restricting production. It does this by allocating each member country a quota for production. Members agree to keep prices high by producing at lower levels than they otherwise would. There is no way to enforce adherence to the quota, so each member has an individual incentive to "cheat" the cartel.

Commodities trader Raymond Learsy, author of Over a Barrel: Breaking the Middle East Oil Cartel, contends that OPEC has trained consumers to believe that oil is a much more finite resource than it is. To back his argument, he points to past false alarms and apparent collaboration. He also believes that peak oil analysts have conspired with OPEC and the oil companies to create a "fabricated drama of peak oil" to drive up oil prices and profits; oil had risen to a little over $30/barrel at that time. A counter-argument was given in the Huffington Post after he and Steve Andrews, co-founder of ASPO, debated on CNBC in June 2007.

Production figures post 2000 
After the millennium, global oil extraction was characterized by sequences of years with relatively stable extraction figures (75 mio. barrel/d 2000–2002, 82-83 mio. barrel/d 2005–2010, 92-95 mio. barrel/d 2015–2019) and two episodes of 9-10% growth in between. 2019's production of 94.961 mio. barrel/d (34.7 bio. barrel/a, 5.5 mio. m3/a) surpassed 2018 by just 0.1%  and was ranked as a candidate for peak oil, as production fell by 7% in 2020 to only partially rebound in 2021 and (expected) in 2022.

Predictions

In 1962, Hubbert predicted that world oil production would peak at a rate of 12.5 billion barrels per year, around the year 2000. In 1974, Hubbert predicted that peak oil would occur in 1995 "if current trends continue". Those predictions proved incorrect. In 2009, a number of industry leaders and analysts believed that world oil production would peak between 2015 and 2030, with a significant chance that the peak would occur before 2020. They consider dates after 2030 implausible. By comparison, a 2014 analysis of production and reserve data predicted a peak in oil production about 2035. Determining a more specific range is difficult due to the lack of certainty over the actual size of world oil reserves. Unconventional oil is not currently predicted to meet the expected shortfall even in a best-case scenario. For unconventional oil to fill the gap without "potentially serious impacts on the global economy", oil production would have to remain stable after its peak, until 2035 at the earliest.

Papers published since 2010 have been relatively pessimistic. A 2010 Kuwait University study predicted production would peak in 2014. A 2010 Oxford University study predicted that production would peak before 2015, but its projection of a change soon "... from a demand-led market to a supply constrained market ..." was incorrect. A 2014 validation of a significant 2004 study in the journal Energy proposed that it is likely that conventional oil production peaked, according to various definitions, between 2005 and 2011. A set of models published in a 2014 Ph.D. thesis predicted that a 2012 peak would be followed by a drop in oil prices, which in some scenarios could turn into a rapid rise in prices thereafter. According to energy blogger Ron Patterson, the peak of world oil production was probably around 2010.

Major oil companies hit peak production in 2005. Several sources in 2006 and 2007 predicted that worldwide production was at or past its maximum. However, in 2013 OPEC's figures showed that world crude oil production and remaining proven reserves were at record highs. According to Matthew Simmons, former Chairman of Simmons & Company International and author of Twilight in the Desert: The Coming Saudi Oil Shock and the World Economy, "peaking is one of these fuzzy events that you only know clearly when you see it through a rear view mirror, and by then an alternate resolution is generally too late."

Possible consequences

The wide use of fossil fuels has been one of the most important stimuli of economic growth and prosperity since the industrial revolution, allowing humans to participate in takedown, or the consumption of energy at a greater rate than it is being replaced. Some believe that when oil production decreases, human culture and modern technological society will be forced to change drastically. The impact of peak oil will depend heavily on the rate of decline and the development and adoption of effective alternatives.

In 2005, the United States Department of Energy published a report titled Peaking of World Oil Production: Impacts, Mitigation, & Risk Management. Known as the Hirsch report, it stated, "The peaking of world oil production presents the U.S. and the world with an unprecedented risk management problem. As peaking is approached, liquid fuel prices and price volatility will increase dramatically, and, without timely mitigation, the economic, social, and political costs will be unprecedented. Viable mitigation options exist on both the supply and demand sides, but to have substantial impact, they must be initiated more than a decade in advance of peaking." Some of the information was updated in 2007.

Oil prices

Historical oil prices

The oil price historically was comparatively low until the 1973 oil crisis and the 1979 oil crisis when it increased more than tenfold during that six-year timeframe. Even though the oil price dropped significantly in the following years, it has never come back to the previous levels. Oil price began to increase again during the 2000s until it hit historical heights of $143 per barrel (2007 inflation adjusted dollars) on 30 June 2008. As these prices were well above those that caused the 1973 and 1979 energy crises, they contributed to fears of an economic recession similar to that of the early 1980s.

It is generally agreed that the main reason for the price spike in 2005–2008 was strong demand pressure. The consumption rates were far above new discoveries in the period, which had fallen to only eight billion barrels of new oil reserves in new accumulations in 2004.

Oil price increases were partially fueled by reports that petroleum production is at or near full capacity. In June 2005, OPEC stated that they would 'struggle' to pump enough oil to meet pricing pressures for the fourth quarter of that year. From 2007 to 2008, the decline in the U.S. dollar against other significant currencies was also considered as a significant reason for the oil price increases, as the dollar lost approximately 14% of its value against the Euro from May 2007 to May 2008.

Besides supply and demand pressures, at times security related factors may have contributed to increases in prices, including the War on Terror, missile launches in North Korea, the Crisis between Israel and Lebanon, nuclear brinkmanship between the U.S. and Iran, and reports from the U.S. Department of Energy and others showing a decline in petroleum reserves.

More recently, between 2011 and 2014 the price of crude oil was relatively stable, fluctuating around $US 100 per barrel. It dropped sharply in late 2014 to below $US70 where it remained for most of 2015. In early 2016 it traded at a low of $US27. The price drop has been attributed to both oversupply and reduced demand as a result of the slowing global economy, OPEC reluctance to concede market share, and a stronger US dollar. These factors may be exacerbated by a combination of monetary policy and the increased debt of oil producers, who may increase production to maintain liquidity.

The onset of the COVID-19 pandemic resulted in oil prices declining from approximately 60 dollars a barrel to 20 between January and April 2020 and market prices briefly becoming negative. On 22 April 2020, the North Dakota's crude oil spot prices were for Williston Sweet $-46.75 and Williston Sour $-51.31 (oilprice charts).
While the WTI was traded $6.46. WTI futures lowest price was above $-37 per barrel on 20 April 2020. In 2021, the record-high energy prices were driven by a global surge in demand as the world quit the economic recession caused by COVID-19, particularly due to strong energy demand in Asia. The price of oil was about $80 by October 2021, the highest since 2014.

Effects of historical oil price rises

In the past, sudden increases in the price of oil have led to economic recessions, such as the 1973 and 1979 energy crises. The effect the increased price of oil has on an economy is known as a price shock. In many European countries, which have high taxes on fuels, such price shocks could potentially be mitigated somewhat by temporarily or permanently suspending the taxes as fuel costs rise. This method of softening price shocks is less useful in countries with much lower gas taxes, such as the United States. A baseline scenario for a recent IMF paper found oil production growing at 0.8% (as opposed to a historical average of 1.8%) would result in a small reduction in economic growth of 0.2–0.4%.

Researchers at the Stanford Energy Modeling Forum found that the economy can adjust to steady, gradual increases in the price of crude better than wild lurches.

Some economists predict that a substitution effect will spur demand for alternate energy sources, such as coal or liquefied natural gas. This substitution can be only temporary, as coal and natural gas are finite resources as well.

Prior to the run-up in fuel prices, many motorists opted for larger, less fuel-efficient sport utility vehicles and full-sized pickups in the United States, Canada, and other countries. This trend has been reversing because of sustained high prices of fuel. The September 2005 sales data for all vehicle vendors indicated SUV sales dropped while small cars sales increased. Hybrid and diesel vehicles are also gaining in popularity.

EIA published Household Vehicles Energy Use: Latest Data and Trends in Nov 2005 illustrating the steady increase in disposable income and $20–30 per barrel price of oil in 2004. The report notes "The average household spent $1,520 on fuel purchases for transport." According to CNBC that expense climbed to $4,155 in 2011.

In 2008, a report by Cambridge Energy Research Associates stated that 2007 had been the year of peak gasoline usage in the United States, and that record energy prices would cause an "enduring shift" in energy consumption practices. The total miles driven in the U.S. peaked in 2006.

The Export Land Model states that after peak oil petroleum exporting countries will be forced to reduce their exports more quickly than their production decreases because of internal demand growth. Countries that rely on imported petroleum will therefore be affected earlier and more dramatically than exporting countries. Mexico is already in this situation. Internal consumption grew by 5.9% in 2006 in the five biggest exporting countries, and their exports declined by over 3%.

Canadian economist Jeff Rubin has stated that high oil prices are likely to result in increased consumption in developed countries through partial manufacturing de-globalisation of trade. Manufacturing production would move closer to the end consumer to minimise transportation network costs, and therefore a demand decoupling from gross domestic product would occur. Higher oil prices would lead to increased freighting costs and consequently, the manufacturing industry would move back to the developed countries since freight costs would outweigh the current economic wage advantage of developing countries. Economic research carried out by the International Monetary Fund puts overall price elasticity of demand for oil at −0.025 short-term and −0.093 long term.

Agricultural effects and population limits

Since supplies of oil and gas are essential to modern agriculture techniques, a fall in global oil supplies could cause spiking food prices and unprecedented famine in the coming decades.

The largest consumer of fossil fuels in modern agriculture is ammonia production (for fertilizer) via the Haber process, which is essential to high-yielding intensive agriculture. The specific fossil fuel input to fertilizer production is primarily natural gas, to provide hydrogen via steam reforming. Given sufficient supplies of renewable electricity, hydrogen can be generated without fossil fuels using methods such as electrolysis. For example, the Vemork hydroelectric plant in Norway used its surplus electricity output to generate renewable ammonia from 1911 to 1971.

Iceland currently generates ammonia using the electrical output from its hydroelectric and geothermal power plants, because Iceland has those resources in abundance while having no domestic hydrocarbon resources, and a high cost for importing natural gas.

Long-term effects on lifestyle

A majority of Americans live in suburbs, a type of low-density settlement designed around universal personal automobile use. Commentators such as James Howard Kunstler argue that the suburbs' reliance on the automobile is an unsustainable living arrangement. Peak oil would leave many Americans unable to afford petroleum based fuel for their cars, and force them to use other forms of transportation such as bicycles or electric vehicles. Additional options include remote work, moving to rural areas, or moving to higher density areas, where walking and public transportation are more viable options. In the latter two cases, suburbs may become the "slums of the future." The issue of petroleum supply and demand is also a concern for growing cities in developing countries (where urban areas are expected to absorb most of the world's projected 2.3 billion population increase by 2050). Stressing the energy component of future development plans is seen as an important goal.

Rising oil prices, if they occur, would also affect the cost of food, heating, and electricity. A high amount of stress would then be put on current middle to low income families as economies contract from the decline in excess funds, decreasing employment rates. The Hirsch/US DoE Report concludes that "without timely mitigation, world supply/demand balance will be achieved through massive demand destruction (shortages), accompanied by huge oil price increases, both of which would create a long period of significant economic hardship worldwide."

Methods that have been suggested for mitigating these urban and suburban issues include the use of non-petroleum vehicles such as electric cars, battery electric vehicles, transit-oriented development, carfree cities, bicycles, new trains, new pedestrianism, smart growth, shared space, urban consolidation, urban villages, and New Urbanism.

An extensive 2009 report on the effects of compact development by the United States National Research Council of the Academy of Sciences, commissioned by the United States Congress, stated six main findings. First, that compact development is likely to reduce "Vehicle Miles Traveled" (VMT) throughout the country. Second, that doubling residential density in a given area could reduce VMT by as much as 25% if coupled with measures such as increased employment density and improved public transportation. Third, that higher density, mixed-use developments would produce both direct reductions in  emissions (from less driving), and indirect reductions (such as from lower amounts of materials used per housing unit, higher efficiency climate control, longer vehicle lifespans, and higher efficiency delivery of goods and services). Fourth, that although short-term reductions in energy use and  emissions would be modest, that these reductions would become more significant over time. Fifth, that a major obstacle to more compact development in the United States is political resistance from local zoning regulators, which would hamper efforts by state and regional governments to participate in land-use planning. Sixth, the committee agreed that changes in development that would alter driving patterns and building efficiency would have various secondary costs and benefits that are difficult to quantify. The report recommends that policies supporting compact development (and especially its ability to reduce driving, energy use, and  emissions) should be encouraged.

An economic theory that has been proposed as a remedy is the introduction of a steady state economy. Such a system could include a tax shifting from income to depleting natural resources (and pollution), as well as the limitation of advertising that stimulates demand and population growth. It could also include the institution of policies that move away from globalization and toward localization to conserve energy resources, provide local jobs, and maintain local decision-making authority. Zoning policies could be adjusted to promote resource conservation and eliminate sprawl.

Since aviation relies mainly on jet fuels derived from crude oil, commercial aviation has been predicted to go into decline with the global oil production.

Mitigation

To avoid the serious social and economic implications a global decline in oil production could entail, the Hirsch report emphasized the need to find alternatives, at least ten to twenty years before the peak, and to phase out the use of petroleum over that time. This was similar to a plan proposed for Sweden that same year. Such mitigation could include energy conservation, fuel substitution, and the use of unconventional oil. The timing of mitigation responses is critical. Premature initiation would be undesirable, but if initiated too late could be more costly and have more negative economic consequences.

Many developed countries are already able to reduce the petro products consumption derived from crude oil. Crude oil consumption in oil exporting countries (OPEC and non OPEC countries), China and India has increased in last decade. The two major consumers, China (second globally) and India (third globally), are taking many steps not to increase their crude oil consumption by encouraging the renewable energy options. These are the clear cut signs that peak oil production due to declining crude oil consumption (not due to declining availability) is imminent in next few years mandated by alternate cheaper energy means/sources. During the year 2020, the crude oil consumption would decrease from earlier year due to COVID-19 pandemic.

Positive aspects
Permaculture sees peak oil as holding tremendous potential for positive change, assuming countries act with foresight. The rebuilding of local food networks, energy production, and the general implementation of "energy descent culture" are argued to be ethical responses to the acknowledgment of finite fossil resources. Majorca is an island currently diversifying its energy supply from fossil fuels to alternative sources and looking back at traditional construction and permaculture methods.

The Transition Towns movement, started in Totnes, Devon and spread internationally by "The Transition Handbook" (Rob Hopkins) and Transition Network, sees the restructuring of society for more local resilience and ecological stewardship as a natural response to the combination of peak oil and climate change.

Criticisms

General arguments
The theory of peak oil is controversial and became an issue of political debate in the US and Europe in the mid-2000s. Critics argued that newly found oil reserves forestalled a peak oil event. Some argued that oil production from new oil reserves and existing fields will continue to increase at a rate that outpaces demand, until alternate energy sources for current fossil fuel dependence are found. In 2015, analysts in the petroleum and financial industries claimed that the "age of oil" had already reached a new stage where the excess supply that appeared in late 2014 may continue.
A consensus was emerging that parties to an international agreement would introduce measures to constrain the combustion of hydrocarbons in an effort to limit global temperature rise to the nominal 2 °C that scientists predicted would limit environmental harm to tolerable levels.

Another argument against the peak oil theory is reduced demand from various options and technologies substituting oil. US federal funding to develop algae fuels increased since 2000 due to rising fuel prices. Many other projects are being funded in
Australia, New Zealand, Europe, the Middle East, and elsewhere and private companies are entering the field.

Oil industry representatives
John Hofmeister, president of Royal Dutch Shell's US operations, while agreeing that conventional oil production would soon start to decline, criticized the analysis of peak oil theory by Matthew Simmons for being "overly focused on a single country: Saudi Arabia, the world's largest exporter and OPEC swing producer." Hofmeister pointed to the large reserves at the US outer continental shelf, which held an estimated  of oil and natural gas. However, only 15% of those reserves were currently exploitable, a good part of that off the coasts of Texas, Louisiana, Mississippi, and Alabama.

Hofmeister also pointed to unconventional sources of oil such as the oil sands of Canada, where Shell was active. The Canadian oil sands—a natural combination of sand, water, and oil found largely in Alberta and Saskatchewan—are believed to contain one trillion barrels of oil. Another trillion barrels are also said to be trapped in rocks in Colorado, Utah, and Wyoming, in the form of oil shale. Environmentalists argue that major environmental, social, and economic obstacles would make extracting oil from these areas excessively difficult. Hofmeister argued that if oil companies were allowed to drill more in the United States enough to produce another , oil and gas prices would not be as high as they were in the late 2000s. He thought in 2008 that high energy prices would cause social unrest similar to the 1992 Rodney King riots.

In 2009, Dr. Christof Rühl, chief economist of BP, argued against the peak oil
hypothesis:

Rühl argued that the main limitations for oil availability are "above ground" factors such as the availability of staff, expertise, technology, investment security, funds, and global warming, and that the oil question was about price and not the physical availability.

In 2008, Daniel Yergin of CERA suggest that a recent high price phase might add to a future demise of the oil industry, not of complete exhaustion of resources or an apocalyptic shock but the timely and smooth setup of alternatives. Yergin went on to say, "This is the fifth time that the world is said to be running out of oil. Each time-whether it was the 'gasoline famine' at the end of WWI or the 'permanent shortage' of the 1970s-technology and the opening of new frontier areas have banished the spectre of decline. There's no reason to think that technology is finished this time."

In 2006, Clive Mather, CEO of Shell Canada, said the Earth's supply of bitumen hydrocarbons was "almost infinite", referring to hydrocarbons in oil sands.

Others
In 2006 attorney and mechanical engineer Peter W. Huber asserted that the world was just running out of "cheap oil", explaining that as oil prices rise, unconventional sources become economically viable. He predicted that, "[t]he tar sands of Alberta alone contain enough hydrocarbon to fuel the entire planet for over 100 years."

Environmental journalist George Monbiot responded to a 2012 report by Leonardo Maugeri by suggesting that there is more than enough oil (from unconventional sources) to "deep-fry" the world with climate change. Stephen Sorrell, senior lecturer Science and Technology Policy Research, Sussex Energy Group, and lead author of the UKERC Global Oil Depletion report, and Christophe McGlade, doctoral researcher at the UCL Energy Institute have criticized Maugeri's assumptions about decline rates.

Peakists 

In the first decade of the twenty-first century, primarily in the United States, widespread beliefs in the imminence of peak oil led to the formation of a large subculture of "peakists" who transformed their lives in response to their belief in and expectation of supply-driven (i.e. resource-constrained) peak oil. They met at national and regional conferences. They also discussed and planned for life after oil, long before this became a regular topic of discussion in regards to climate change.

Researchers estimate that at the peak of this subculture there were over 100,000 hard-core "peakists" in the United States. The popularity of this subculture started to diminish around 2013, as a dramatic peak did not arrive, and as "unconventional" fossil fuels (such as tar sands and natural gas via hydrofracking) seemed to pick up the slack in the context of declines in "conventional" petroleum.

The decline of the interest in peak oil predated empirical evidence that peak oil had not happened at the time forecast by Campbell.

See also

References

Notes

Citations

Further information

Books
 
 
 Campbell, Colin J. (2005). Oil Crisis Multi-Science Publishing.
 Campbell, Colin J. (2013). Campbell's Atlas of Oil and Gas Depletion 
 
 
 
 
 
 
 
 
 
 
 Herberg, Mikkal (2014). Energy Security and the Asia-Pacific: Course Reader. United States: The National Bureau of Asian Research.

Articles
 
 
 
 De Young, R. (2014). "Some behavioral aspects of energy descent." Frontiers in Psychology, 5(1255).

Documentary films
 The End of Suburbia: Oil Depletion and the Collapse of the American Dream (2004)
 A Crude Awakening: The Oil Crash (2006)
 The Power of Community: How Cuba Survived Peak Oil (2006)
 Crude Impact (2006)
 What a Way to Go: Life at the End of Empire (2007)
 Crude (2007) Australian Broadcasting Corporation documentary [3 x 30 minutes] about the formation of oil, and humanity's use of it
 PetroApocalypse Now? (2008)
 Blind Spot (2008)
 GasHole (2008)
 Collapse (2009)
 Peak Oil: A Staggering Challenge to "Business As Usual"

Podcasts
 Saudi America? – The U.S. Oil Boom in Perspective
 KunstlerCast 275 — Art Berman Clarifies Whatever Happened to Peak Oil

External links

 Association for the Study of Peak Oil International
 Eating Fossil Fuels FromTheWilderness.com
 Peak Oil Primer – Resilience.org; Peak Oil related articles – Resilience.org
 Evolutionary psychology and peak oil: A Malthusian inspired "heads up" for humanity An overview of peak oil, possible impacts, and mitigation strategies, by Dr. Michael Mills
 Energy Export Databrowser-Visual review of production and consumption trends for individual nations; data from the BP Annual Statistical Review
 Peak oil – EAA-PHEV Wiki Electric vehicles provide an opportunity to transition away from fueling our vehicles with petroleum fuels.